Abandoned Garden is an album by American vocalist Michael Franks. Released in 1995 by Warner Bros. Records, it was Franks' thirteenth studio album and his final album of new material with Warner Bros.

Background
The album is a dedication to the memory of Brazilian jazz musician, singer and composer Antônio Carlos Jobim. Franks had drawn artistic inspiration throughout his career from Jobim, and had collaborated with him in the past.

"Somehow Our Love Survives" marked the return of keyboardist and lyricist Joe Sample, with whom Franks had collaborated on numerous albums, including Sleeping Gypsy in 1977 and Blue Pacific in 1990.

Track listing

Reception

Writing for AllMusic, Ross Boissoneau praised the input of "heavy hitters" but lamented it was "neither Franks' best effort nor particularly evocative of the great Brazilian composer" the album was dedicated to. He concluded "while the revolving door of stars has served Franks well on other recordings, here they don't seem to add up to much."

Down Beat magazine rated the album "good" in their March 1996 issue, reporting it to be "a genuine keeper, a guilty pleasure. Somehow Franks, a song stylist more than a jazz vocalist, once again gets his way, singing his indelible melodies that before you know it are under your skin, into your veins and etched into your soul..."

Personnel

Musicians

 Michael Franksvocals, guitar, banjo
 Keith O'Quinntrombone
 Randy Breckerflugelhorn
 Michael Breckertenor saxophone
 Joshua Redmansoprano saxophone
 David Sanborn, Andy Snitzeralto saxophone
 Lawrence Feldmanalto flute
 Bob Mintzerflute, alto flute
 Eliane Elias, Russell Ferrante, Gil Goldstein, Bob James, Carla Bleypiano
 John Leventhalelectric guitar
 Chuck Loebguitar
 Jeff Mironovguitar, acoustic guitar
 Diane Barere, Mark Orrin Shuman, Frederick Slotkincello
 Manolo Badrenawoodwinds, percussion
 Peter Erskinedrums, percussion
 Chris Parker, Lewis Nashdrums
 Don Alias, Bashiri Johnsonpercussion
 Brian Mitchellvocals

Support
 Jimmy Haslip, Michael Colina, Russell Ferrantearrangement
 James Farberaudio mixer
 Ken Schles, Fredrick Nilsenphotography
 Recording at Bearsville Studios, Clinton, Make Believe Ballroom, Power Station, Sound on Sound

References

Bibliography

Michael Franks (musician) albums
1993 albums
Warner Records albums
Albums produced by Matt Pierson